Reginald Gervis Hargreaves (13 October 1852 – 13 February 1926) was an English cricketer who played first-class cricket for Hampshire. He also played at first-class level for Marylebone Cricket Club (MCC), an England XI, Gentlemen of England, I Zingari and AW Ridley's XI. He married Alice Liddell, who as a girl had inspired Lewis Carroll's fantasy stories.

Cricket career
Hargreaves made his first-class debut for Hampshire against Kent at Catford Bridge in June 1875, scoring 9 and 1 and taking no wickets as Kent won by an innings inside two days.
His next game, against Sussex in the only first-class match ever played on the Green Jackets Ground in Winchester,
saw another innings defeat for Hampshire, but Hargreaves claimed his first wickets by taking 3/86 in the first innings.

Hargreaves' career-best score came while playing for an England XI against Cambridge University in 1877; he top-scored with 46 in the English first innings to help set up a four-wicket victory.
With the ball, he took four wickets on just one occasion, recording figures of 4/55 for Hampshire against Derbyshire in July 1878; Hampshire were nevertheless once again beaten by an innings.

His last two first-class appearances came two years apart. In August 1883, he played for Hampshire against Somerset at the Antelope Ground in Southampton, and was dismissed in the second innings by Edward Bastard. Hargreaves' final match at this level, in August 1885, was once more against Somerset at Southampton, but this time the venue was the County Ground, enjoying its first season of use. Once more (in the first innings) he was dismissed by Bastard, though Hargreaves ended his career by being run out in the second.

At the time of his death aged 73, he was a vice-president of Hampshire County Cricket Club.

Notes

References
 
 
Profile at Cricket-Online.com
The Peerage.com

1852 births
1926 deaths
English cricketers
Hampshire cricketers
Marylebone Cricket Club cricketers
I Zingari cricketers
Gentlemen of England cricketers
Non-international England cricketers
A. W. Ridley's XI cricketers
Liddell family